"No One Else on Earth" is a song written by Jill Colucci, Stewart Harris and Sam Lorber, performed by American country music artist Wynonna.  It was released in August 1992 as the third single from Wynonna's self-titled debut album.  It was also that album's third Number One hit on the Billboard Hot Country Singles & Tracks (now Hot Country Songs) charts.  It was remixed for release in the UK in 1994, titled "No One Else on Earth '94". It was released on cassette, vinyl, and CD formats. This version was released internationally on Wynonna's first solo compilation album, Collection, in 1997, labeled as "No One Else on Earth (Club Mix)".  This version was used for the music video for the song.

Personnel
The following musicians performed on this track:
Eddie Bayers – drums
John Cowan – background vocals
Wynonna Judd – lead vocals
Jonell Mosser – background vocals
Steve Nathan – keyboards
Don Potter – electric guitar
Matt Rollings – keyboards
Steuart Smith – electric guitar
Willie Weeks – bass guitar

Critical reception
Lisa Smith and Cyndi Hoelzle of Gavin Report wrote that "This song is unstoppable, with an irresistably funky groove."

Chart performance
"No One Else on Earth" held the No. 1 position on Hot Country Songs for four weeks, making it one of four songs to hold that position for four or more weeks in 1992. The other songs to achieve this that year were "Boot Scootin' Boogie" by Brooks & Dunn, "What She's Doing Now" by Garth Brooks, and "Achy Breaky Heart" by Billy Ray Cyrus.

Year-end charts

References

1992 singles
Wynonna Judd songs
Song recordings produced by Tony Brown (record producer)
Songs written by Jill Colucci
MCA Records singles
Curb Records singles
Songs written by Stewart Harris
1992 songs
Songs written by Sam Lorber